Eastern Arabian cuisine, also called Khaleeji cuisine, is the traditional Arabic cuisine variant that is shared by the population in Eastern Arabia and areas around the Persian Gulf. Seafood is a very significant part of the diet of the inhabitants of the coastal region of Eastern Arabia. Fish is very popular. The cuisine of eastern Arabia is different from the cuisine of the Arabs of Hejaz, Yemen, Najd, Oman, and other parts of Arabia. Harees is also a very popular dish in the region.

Eastern Arabian cuisine today forms the traditional cuisine for countries such as Kuwait, Bahrain, Qatar, United Arab Emirates, and southern part of Iraq, eastern parts of Saudi Arabia and Oman, each with slight local variation.

History

Originally, the inhabitants of the Eastern Arabia relied heavily on a diet of dates, wheat, barley, rice and meat, with little variety, and with a heavy emphasis on yogurt products, such as "leben" (لبن) (yogurt without butterfat). Globalization and contact with ancient civilizations such as the Romans, Persians, and later on with the Ottomans brought the Arabs in close contact with dishes of several other cultures, as well as introducing several new ingredients in their diet.

As with most Asian cultures, the culinary heritage can find its root in either Persian, Indian, or Chinese cuisines. In fact the food structure of Persian-Arabian civilization began with cooking techniques innovated in ancient Persia and carried forward by Persians during the Sassanid Dynasty. With subsequent development and growth of the Ottomans (Turkish empire), Arab culture came in contact with the Ottoman empire; Turkish contributions to the Arabian culture included "kebabs".

This multicultural inclusion became possible after the advent of Islam, and with the growth of Arabian influence after the invasion of Persia, Balkans, and North Africa, making it possible for merchants of different nations to travel long distances coming into contact and being influenced by or influencing local cuisines they encountered. The exchange of customs and food was bidirectional, with Arabs also exporting their dietary preferences such as dates, figs, and lamb to the areas they traveled to or conquered including the Persian empire and the Turkish population of Balkan. This interchange of goods and ways of life, was significant in forming the current modern Arab diet. Arabs later on transferred these newly gained cuisines on their conquests to Africa, and as far as North Africa, West Africa, and South of Spain. In fact, certain Spanish desserts such as polvorones, tocino de cielo (custard and caramel) and yemas de San Leandro (marzipan based) are heavily influenced by the Moors. Though these influences were not carried out by the original Arabs of the Arabian sub-continent, their westward expansion into Egypt, and Morocco led to dissemination of Chinese, Indian, Arabian, and Persian cuisines and eventually their vicarious adoption by the North Africans.

Ingredients
Eastern Arabian cuisine today is the result of combination of diverse cuisines, incorporating Persian, Indian,  Lebanese and Chinese cooking styles, and many items not originally indigenous to the region, which were most probably imported on the dhows and the caravans. In addition, the cuisine is heavily dosed with spices, from hot sauces to every variety of pepper, to tea. This cuisine also favors vegetables such as cucumbers, eggplants, and onions, and fruits (primarily citrus). Notably, many of the same spices used in eastern Arabia cuisine are also those emphasized in the Indian cuisine. This is a result of heavy trading between the two regions, and of the current state of affairs in the wealthy oil states, in which many South Asian workers are living abroad in Eastern Arabia.

National cuisines
Bahraini cuisine
Emirati cuisine
Kuwaiti cuisine
Omani cuisine
Qatari cuisine
Saudi Arabian cuisine

Culture

Essential to any cooking in eastern Arabia is the concept of hospitality. Meals are sometimes family affairs, with much sharing and a great deal of warmth over the dinner table. Formal dinners and celebrations generally entail large quantities of food, and every occasion entails large quantities of coffee.

There are many regional differences in Arab cuisine. For instance mujadara in Syria or Lebanon is different from mujadara in Jordan or Palestine. Some dishes such as mensaf (the national dish of Jordan) are native to certain countries and rarely if ever make an appearance in other countries.

Unlike in most Western cuisines, cinnamon is used in meat dishes as well as in sweets such as Baklava. Other desserts include variations of rice pudding and fried dough. Ground nut mixtures are common fillings for such treats. Saffron is used in everything, from sweets, to rice, to beverages. Fruit juices are quite popular in this often arid region.

Influences
In addition to Arab cuisine, the following cuisines have influenced, or have been influenced by the Eastern Arabian cuisine, either due to trade (mostly maritime from the far east), or as a result of ancient contact:

 Indian cuisine
 African cuisine
 Balochi cuisine
 Fusion cuisine
 Iranian cuisine

References

Further reading
 Al-Hamad, Sarah, Cardamom and Lime: Tastes of the Arabian Gulf, 2015 , Fox Chapel Publishing,

External links

Arab cuisine
Middle Eastern cuisine
Arab culture
Arabian Peninsula